Matt Tinney (born 23 May 1984) is an Australian journalist.

He is currently a presenter and reporter at Seven News Perth and Perth correspondent on Sunrise.

Career
Tinney began his reporting career at WIN Television's national headquarters in Wollongong in 2005. He joined WIN News after completing a Bachelor of Arts (Political Science and Italian) at the University of Melbourne, including an internship with the Victorian Parliament.

While studying, Melbourne-born Tinney worked in community television and radio at Channel 31 and SYN FM. For three years, he presented and reported on news, current affairs, and entertainment programs, and received awards for his coverage.

In December 2005, Tinney joined WIN Television in Wollongong as a political reporter. He also presented news updates and bulletins for WIN News WA, Riverina/MIA (NSW), Central West (NSW) and Illawarra (NSW).

In February 2008, Tinney moved to Western Australia to Perth and joined the Nine News team as a reporter and co-anchor of the weekend news with Sharlyn Sarac.

In 2009, he was awarded the Tourism Award at the Western Australian Journalists Association Awards.

In April 2011, Tinney was appointed WIN News Western Australia weeknight presenter replacing Deborah Kennedy. He left this role during 2012 to present Nine's Afternoon News in Perth.
From November 2012 to January 2013 he was the interim presenter of Nine News Perth on weeknights, following Greg Pearce's resignation. After Tim McMillan's appointment, he resumed the Nine Afternoon News, replacing Lee Steele.

In December 2014, Tinney resigned from the Nine Network and later announced that in January 2015 he would join the Seven Network as a Perth correspondent on Sunrise. In May 2015, Sunrise introduced a Perth bulletin, anchored by Tinney, into its program, which airs at 7:00 am in place of one of the national news updates.

References

External links
 The 9 News Team

Nine News presenters
Living people
Australian television journalists
1984 births
People educated at St. Bernard's College, Melbourne